James Alexander Tyng (May 27, 1856 – October 30, 1931) is known as the first baseball player to wear a catcher's mask while playing for Harvard College in 1877.  The team manager, Fred Thayer, received a patent for the mask in 1878.

Early life
Tyng was born in Philadelphia, Pennsylvania, on May 27, 1856.

Baseball career
In 1879, Tyng became the first Harvard player selected to play in the majors, when he was picked up by Harry Wright and the Boston Red Caps as an emergency pitcher. Tyng defeated the first-place Providence Grays to draw the Red Caps within two games of the Grays. It was the only victory in his major league career. Tyng continued to pitch as an amateur for the Staten Island Athletic Club and repeatedly turned down offers to play in the major leagues. Later, in 1888, he pitched in one game for the Philadelphia Phillies.

Amateur golf career
Tyng was also an accomplished amateur golfer.  He played in the 1897 U.S. Open held at the Chicago Golf Club in Wheaton, Illinois.  He shot rounds of 86-91=177 finishing near the middle of the field.  He managed to beat several professionals, chief among them Bert Way and Robert White.

External links

Baseball Almanac – Harvard University Baseball Players Who Made it to the Major Leagues
Baseball Almanac – Jim Tyng page
Harvard Magazine: Home-plate Security, article by Stephen Eschenbach, July–August, 2004

References

1856 births
1931 deaths
Major League Baseball pitchers
Boston Red Caps players
Philadelphia Phillies players
Harvard Crimson baseball players
Baseball players from Philadelphia
19th-century baseball players
Harvard College alumni